Leslie Lear (August 22, 1918 – January 5, 1979) was a National Football League and Canadian Football League player and coach as well as an owner and trainer of Thoroughbred race horses.

Football
He grew up in Manitoba, Canada, where he played guard at the University of Manitoba. Lear started his professional football career with the Winnipeg Blue Bombers of the Canadian Football League and helped the team to two Grey Cup victories. In 1944, he signed with the Cleveland Rams of the NFL becoming the first Canadian-trained player to play in the NFL. He would play a total of 4 seasons in the NFL.  After his stint in the NFL, Lear returned to Canada where he coached the Grey Cup champion Calgary Stampeders to an undefeated season in 1948- the only CFL team to go undefeated in a season.

CFL coaching record

Horse racing
Following his retirement from football, Les Lear became involved in Thoroughbred horse racing both as a horse trainer and an owner.

Later life and death
Lear was elected into the Canadian Football Hall of Fame in 1974. He died of kidney failure on January 5, 1979.

Lear was posthumously inducted into the Manitoba Sports Hall of Fame in 2019.

References

1918 births
1979 deaths
American football offensive linemen
Canadian football offensive linemen
Canadian horse trainers
Canadian players of American football
Canadian racehorse owners and breeders
Calgary Stampeders coaches
Calgary Stampeders players
Cleveland Rams players
Manitoba Bisons football players
Winnipeg Blue Bombers players
Canadian Football Hall of Fame inductees
Sportspeople from Manitoba
People from Walsh County, North Dakota
Deaths from kidney failure